Jean-Yves Mvoto Owono (born 6 September 1988) is a French professional footballer who plays as a defender for German club Wormatia Worms. He has also appeared for English teams Oldham Athletic, Barnsley, Leyton Orient, Polish team Zawisza Bydgoszcz, as well as Scottish sides Raith Rovers and Dunfermline Athletic.

Club career
Mvoto was born in Paris. He joined Sunderland on a -year contract for an undisclosed fee on 15 January 2008. On 7 August 2009, Mvoto signed a six-month loan with Southend United.

On 12 January 2010, Mvoto extended his loan with Southend until the end of the season. He scored his first goal for Southend in a 2–2 draw with future club Oldham Athletic on 24 April 2010.

On 5 August 2010 he, along with teammate Oumare Tounkara, joined Oldham Athletic on a season-long loan. He scored his first Oldham goal on 30 October 2010 in a 4–2 victory over Plymouth Argyle. After being virtually ever present for the team he injured his ankle and Oldham cancelled the remainder of his loan in January 2011.
However, on 18 March 2011, after regaining full fitness, Oldham Athletic re-signed the defender on loan from Sunderland until the end of the season. On 7 April Sunderland announced that he was amongst eight players to be released at the end of the season.

On 30 June 2011, Oldham Athletic announced that Mvoto had signed a two-year contract with the club, despite interest from other clubs.

Mvoto signed a two-year contract with Championship club Barnsley on 23 July 2013.

After leaving Barnsley in the summer of 2015, he spent some time without a club before signing on a two-month contract with League Two club Leyton Orient on 20 November 2015. On 20 January 2016, Leyton Orient announced that Mvoto would be departing the club at the conclusion of his two-month deal.

In January 2016 he signed at Polish club Zawisza Bydgoszcz.

On 8 July 2016 it was announced that Mvoto had then signed for Raith Rovers. After one year with Raith, Mvoto signed a one-year deal for Fife rivals Dunfermline Athletic in May 2017. Mvoto left East End Park at the end of his contract.

Mvoto joined Norwegian Third Division side Nybergsund in April 2019.

International career
Mvoto is a former France Under-19 international.

Career statistics

References

External links

1988 births
Living people
Footballers from Paris
French footballers
France youth international footballers
French sportspeople of Cameroonian descent
Association football defenders
Paris Saint-Germain F.C. players
Sunderland A.F.C. players
Southend United F.C. players
Oldham Athletic A.F.C. players
Barnsley F.C. players
Leyton Orient F.C. players
Zawisza Bydgoszcz players
Raith Rovers F.C. players
Dunfermline Athletic F.C. players
Nybergsund IL players
Wormatia Worms players
English Football League players
I liga players
Scottish Professional Football League players
Oberliga (football) players
Regionalliga players
French expatriate footballers
Expatriate footballers in England
French expatriate sportspeople in England
Expatriate footballers in Poland
French expatriate sportspeople in Poland
Expatriate footballers in Germany
French expatriate sportspeople in Germany